Drum Point Light is one of four surviving Chesapeake Bay screw-pile lighthouses. Originally located off Drum Point at the mouth of the Patuxent River, it is now an exhibit at the Calvert Marine Museum.

History
The earliest recorded call for a light at Drum Point came in report by one Lt. William D. Porter to the Secretary of the Treasury. In the 1850s funds were appropriated and some initial surveys made; disputes between the state of Maryland and the federal government over the property to be used eventually brought these efforts to naught. If this project had been carried through, it would have been an early example of a screw-pile lighthouse in the bay, as the Pungoteague Creek Light had been finished only two years earlier. The original appropriation was to construct a pair of range lights, for reasons that remain obscure. The funds were not adequate for such a project and it was never seriously considered for execution. Instead, a screw-pile light was prefabricated in parts at Lazaretto Point, and the light was erected in about a month, being lit for the first time in August of that year.

The light was needed in the first place because of the considerable shoaling around the point. This gradually shifted the shoreline to the point where the light, which originally stood in ten feet of water, was entirely on land in 1970. At the turn of the century a small bridge was constructed from the light to the shore (as visible in the photograph), allowing the keeper's family to live with him in the light.

Unlike many such lights, Drum Point escaped ice damage. The storm of 1933 flooded the house and sank the tender, however.

Originally a fixed red light was shown, with dark sectors added starting in 1889. This was changed in 1911 to a fixed white light with red sectors. The light was converted to electricity in 1944 and automated in 1960. The light was discontinued two years later, replaced at first by a lighted buoy, and then a fixed offshore light. Unlike other such conversions, however, the house was not torn down, but simply abandoned. The Calvert County Historical Society attempted to acquire the light as early as 1966, but they did not gain possession until 1974, and the federal government retained the land on which it sat. However, due to a grant and the timely assistance of the B.F. Diamond Construction Company (which was constructing a bridge over the Patuxent nearby) the light was cut from the ground and barged to its current location. Restoration was aided by many grants and the donation of much period furnishings, and the light was rededicated as an exhibit in June 1978. Fortuitously, the complete logbooks from 1883 to 1943 survive as well, providing an excellent glimpse into the life of a lighthouse keeper.

References

Drum Point Lighthouse, from the Chesapeake Chapter of the United States Lighthouse Society
Drum Point Lighthouse at lighthousefriends.com
Dodds, Richard J. "Drum Point Lighthouse - Its Origins Revisited" in Bugeye Times - the Quarterly Newsletter of the Calvert Marine Museum. Vol 18, No. 4 (Winter 1993/1994). Online copy here

External links

Drum Point Lighthouse at the Calvert Marine Museum website

Chesapeake Bay Lighthouse Project - Drum Point Light
, including photo from 1984, at Maryland Historical Trust

Lighthouses completed in 1883
Lighthouses on the National Register of Historic Places in Maryland
Transportation buildings and structures in Calvert County, Maryland
Lighthouses in the Chesapeake Bay
National Register of Historic Places in Calvert County, Maryland